Face to Face is the sixth album released by R&B singer Evelyn "Champagne" King on RCA Records in 1983. It was produced by André Cymone, Leon Sylvers III, Foster Sylvers, and Joey Gallo.

Background
Straying from the post-disco sound prominent in her most commercially successful releases I'm in Love and Get Loose she embarked on a "punk funk" sound, moving towards the musical territory of Prince and the alike. In charge of the album production and musical direction was Leon Sylvers III, SOLAR Records producer known for his work for Shalamar and The Whispers, and Andre Cymone, a former bass player for Prince, replacing Kashif and Paul Lawrence Jones III.

History
The album peaked at #24 on the R&B albums chart. It also reached #91 on the Billboard 200. It produced the hit singles "Action", "Shake Down", and "Teenager". The album was digitally remastered and reissued on CD with bonus tracks in 2011 by Funky Town Grooves Records.

Track listing

Personnel
Evelyn "Champagne" King - Lead and Backing Vocals
Foster Sylvers - Bass, Backing Vocals
Leon Sylvers III - Keyboards, Percussion
Joey Gallo, William Bryant II - Keyboards, Synthesizer Bass
Marlo Henderson, Micki Free - Guitar
Ricky Smith - Bass, Keyboards
Terry Murphy - Keyboards
Wardell Potts, Jr. - Drums
Jorge Bermudez, Terrence F. Floyd, Theodore Welch - Percussion
Dana Meyers, Karon Floyd, Doris Ann Rhodes, Germain Brooks, Sheila Rankin - Backing Vocals

Charts

Singles

References

External links

1983 albums
Evelyn "Champagne" King albums
RCA Records albums
Albums produced by Leon Sylvers III
Albums produced by André Cymone
New wave albums by American artists